William Elyot was an English churchman, Archdeacon of Barnstaple during 1503. He had been a Fellow of All Souls College, Oxford and rector of Blackawton.

References

Archdeacons of Barnstaple
Fellows of All Souls College, Oxford
16th-century English clergy